Joachim Piccolomini (1258 – 10 April 1305), also known as Joachim of Siena, or, in Italian, Giovacchino Piccolomini, was an Italian Servite tertiary from Siena.

Life
Joachim Piccolomini was born into a noble family of Siena, Italy. A pious youth, he was especially noted for his devotion to the Blessed Virgin Mary. His greatest childhood pleasure was to pray the Ave Maria before an image of the Blessed Lady of Sorrows. He was also known from an early age to exhibit extreme sensitivity to the plight of the poor. He gave them his own clothes, and spent his pocket money on almsgiving. One day when Joachim urged his father to increase his aid to the distressed, his father argued that prudence ought to moderate his liberality. Otherwise, he would reduce his whole family to poverty. Joachim is said to have replied, "You have taught me that an alms is given to Jesus Christ, in the persons of the poor: can we refuse him any thing? And what is the advantage of riches, but that they be employed in purchasing treasures in heaven?" Hearing these sentiments, his father wept for joy.

Joachim joined the Servites as a lay-brother at the age of fourteen, becoming a spiritual student of Saint Philip Benizi. By all reports, he was a perfect model of virtue; it was not unusual to find him at midnight, praying, while the rest of the house slept, and on Saturdays, Joachim abstained from all food in honor of the Seven Dolours of the Virgin. His fervor grew, yet instilled in him an extraordinary humility. Joachim was urged by his brothers to study and be ordained a priest, but he felt he was unworthy, and wanted nothing grander than to be an altar server. It would appear that his whole life was an attempt to hide himself from the eyes of others and live in obscurity. In fact, he had become so well-respected and widely known for his sanctity that he requested that he be transferred to Arezzo. The move aroused such a stir of complaints in Siena that he was ordered to return.

Death
According to the legend Joachim reportedly died when he was unable to console an epileptic with words, so he begged God that he might take the illness upon himself. He died of epilepsy in 1305.

One account of Joachim's hagiography has the Blessed Virgin appearing to him at important times in his life, such as in his adolescence, when she urged him to join the Servites. The second time, she appeared with two crowns in her hands; one of rubies to reward him for his compassion in her sorrows, and the other of pearls, in recompense for his virginity, which he had vowed in her honor.

Shortly before his death, the account continues, she once more appeared. Joachim begged her that he would die on the same day on which Jesus Christ had died. The Virgin immediately gratified him, saying, "It is well, prepare thyself; for to-morrow, Good Friday, thou shalt die suddenly as thou desirest—to-morrow thou shalt be with me in heaven." So, during the singing of the Passion according to Saint John, at the words "Now there stood by the cross of Jesus, His Mother", Joachim fell into his last struggles of death, and at the words "He bowed down his head and expired", Joachim died. The whole church was filled with an extraordinary light and a sweet-smelling perfume.

Veneration
Blessed Joachim Piccolomini was beatified by Pope Paul V on 21 March 1609. He is commonly depicted as a Servite holding a book and a flower, and is venerated especially in Arezzo and Siena.

References

External links
  Den salige Joakim av Siena (1258-1306)

Servites
1258 births
1305 deaths
Joachim
Italian beatified people
People from Siena
14th-century venerated Christians